Phellodon mississippiensis is a species of tooth fungus in the family Bankeraceae. It was described as new to science by mycologist Richard Baird in 2014 from collections made in the Tombigbee National Forest in Mississippi. It is one of the few Phellodon species with clamp connections in the hyphae.

References

External links

Fungi described in 2014
Fungi of the United States
Inedible fungi
mississippiensis
Fungi without expected TNC conservation status